Sir (Edward) Enoch Jenkins (8 February 1895 – 25 February 1960) was a British lawyer and judge. He served as Attorney General of Fiji from 1938 to 1945. He subsequently served as Chief Justice of Nyasaland.

Early life 

Jenkins was born in Cardiff, Wales, on 8 February 1895 to William Jenkins and Briar Dene. He was known by his middle name. Educated initially at Howard Gardens Municipal Secondary School in Cardiff, he later studied at University College of South Wales and Monmouthshire, also in Cardiff.

Jenkins served as a lieutenant with the Royal Field Artillery during and after the First World War (1914-1920, and again in 1925).

He was admitted to Cambridge University on 16 May 1919, taking up residence in Peterhouse on 8 October and beginning his matriculation on 21 October that year. He graduated with B.A. and LL.B degrees in 1922. He subsequently earned a postgraduate M.A. degree in 1928.

Legal career

Jenkins was called to the bar at Gray's Inn on 14 May 1924. He entered the colonial service in Nyasaland in 1925, before becoming Solicitor General of Northern Rhodesia in 1936. He then served as Attorney General of Fiji from 1938 to 1945; towards the end of his term, he was appointed Chief Justice of Nyasaland on 8 November 1944. As Chief Justice, he headed a commission of inquiry into a riot that had taken place at Zomba Prison in November 1949. He was criticised by both Sir Geoffrey Colby, the Governor of Nyasaland, and the Legislative Council, for allegedly paying undue attention to "matters of relatively minor significance" and of ignoring what they believed was the fundamental cause of the problem: the breakdown of discipline in the prison over the previous two years.

Sometime before September 1953, he was appointed a Justice of Appeal on the Kenya-based Court of Appeal for Eastern Africa. He sat as one of the judges on Jomo Kenyatta's unsuccessful appeal against his conviction for organizing the Mau Mau movement. He was still reported as serving on the Court of Appeal as of 24 December 1954.

References

British colonial officials
Attorneys General of the Colony of Fiji
Solicitors general
British Kenya judges
Chief Justices of Nyasaland
1895 births
1960 deaths
British expatriates in Fiji
Members of Gray's Inn
Alumni of Peterhouse, Cambridge
Alumni of Cardiff University
20th-century Welsh lawyers
East African Court of Appeal judges
British Army personnel of World War I
Royal Field Artillery officers